Not Now, Darling is a 1967 farce written by English playwrights John Chapman and Ray Cooney, first staged at the Richmond Theatre, in Richmond, England prior to a long West End run. The production starred Donald Sinden and Bernard Cribbins, with Jill Melford, Mary Kenton, Brian Wilde, Carmel McSharry and Ann Sidney.

It was adapted as a film in 1973.

References

Further reading

External links

 
 

1967 plays
Broadway plays
Comedy plays
Plays by Ray Cooney
Plays by John Chapman
West End plays